Hyalurga caralis is a moth of the family Erebidae. It was described by Herbert Druce in 1885. It is found in Ecuador.

References

Hyalurga
Moths described in 1885